Caeciliusetae is an infraorder of Psocodea (formerly Psocoptera) in the suborder Psocomorpha. There are about 6 families and more than 1,300 described species in Caeciliusetae.

Families 
These six families belong to the infraorder Caeciliusetae:
 Amphipsocidae Pearman, 1936 (hairy-winged barklice)
 Asiopsocidae Mockford & Garcia Aldrete, 1976
 Caeciliusidae Mockford, 2000 (lizard barklice)
 Dasydemellidae Mockford, 1978 (shaggy psocids)
 Paracaeciliidae Mockford, 1989
 Stenopsocidae Pearman, 1936 (narrow barklice)

References 

 Lienhard, C. & Smithers, C. N. 2002. Psocoptera (Insecta): World Catalogue and Bibliography. Instrumenta Biodiversitatis, vol. 5. Muséum d'histoire naturelle, Genève.

 
Insect infraorders